The 2017 MTV EMAs (also known as the MTV Europe Music Awards) were held at The SSE Arena in Wembley, London, United Kingdom, on 12 November 2017. The ceremony's host was Rita Ora, with voiceovers provided by Capital FM DJ Roman Kemp. This was the sixth time that the UK hosted the ceremony, and the second time London was the host city. London first hosted the ceremony in 1996 at Alexandra Palace. The ceremony was directed for television by British award-winning multi camera director Hamish Hamilton.

Taylor Swift was nominated for six awards followed by Shawn Mendes who was nominated for five. Mendes won four awards becoming the most awarded artist of the night.

Nominations
Winners are in bold text.

Regional nominations
Winners are in bold text.

Performances

Pre show

Main Show

Appearances
 Natalie Dormer and Paul Pogba — presented Best Song
 Prophets of Rage — presented Best Hip-Hop
 Skylar Grey and Hailey Baldwin — presented Best Video
 James Bay and Nathalie Emmanuel — presented Best Alternative
 Sabrina Carpenter and Daya — presented Best Pop
 Madison Beer and Dele Alli  — presented Best Artist
 Jared Leto  — presented Global Icon
 Rita Ora - presented a clip of George Michael's performance at the 1994 EMAs as an in memoriam segment, featuring Michael, Chris Cornell, Chester Bennington and Tom Petty

See also
2017 MTV Video Music Awards

References

External links
Official website 

mtv
Music in London
2017
2017 in London